Joseph Charles (February 9, 1868 – February 10, 1950) was an American tennis player. He competed in the men's singles and doubles events at the 1904 Summer Olympics.

References

1868 births
1950 deaths
American male tennis players
Olympic tennis players of the United States
Tennis players at the 1904 Summer Olympics
People from Boonville, Missouri
Sportspeople from Missouri
Tennis people from Missouri